El amor está de moda (Love is in Fashion) is a 1995 Chilean telenovela produced and broadcast by Canal 13, based on the Brazilian telenovela Ti Ti Ti created by Cassiano Gabus Mendes.

Cast 
 Roberto Poblete as Aristóteles Sepúlveda / "Vittorio Valentini".
 Fernando Kliche as Andrés Correa / "Jack Volteare".
 Esperanza Silva as Susana Acevedo.
 Liliana García as Jacqueline.
 Katty Kowaleczko as Claudia.
 Aline Küppenheim as Valeria Correa.
 Claudia Conserva as Gabriela "Gaby".
 Cristián de la Fuente as Lucas Correa.
 Luciano Cruz-Coke as Juan Pablo Sepúlveda.
 Adriana Vacarezza as Carmen Cáceres.
 Gloria Münchmeyer as Cecilia Correa.
 Patricia Guzmán as Julia Correa.
 Walter Kliche as Hugo Cáceres.
 Sandra Solimano as Sonia.
 Paulina Urrutia as Soledad.
 Boris Quercia as Domingo.
 Andrea Freund as Catalina Andrade.
 Guido Vecchiola as Jorge.
 Marcela Osorio as Solange.
 Alfredo Castro as Leonardo "León" Soto.
 Verónica Moraga as Javiera.
 Felipe Castro as Bob.
 Felipe Armas as Pancho.
 Francisco López as Alex Correa.
 Luz Croxatto as Florencia.
 Gabriela Hernández como Leonor.
 Paola Camaggi como Patricia.
 Alex Zissis como Hernán Mujica. 
 Felipe Viel como Antonio.
 Carlos Díaz as Samuel.
 Pía Salas as Amanda.
 Gloria Laso as María Luisa Valdivieso.
 José Secall as Agustín Andrade.
 María Elena Duvauchelle as Soraya.
 Patricio Achurra as Gonzalo.
 Carmen Barros as Aurora Zañartu.
 Sonia Viveros as Ruth.
 Francisca Merino as Marcela.
 Teresita Reyes as Lucía.
 Myriam Palacios as Rosalía.
 Hernan Hevia as Caco.
 Juan Falcón as Adriano.
 Alicia Pedroso as Nelly.
 Verónica González as Camila.
 Constanza Piwonka as Rocío.
 Pedro Vicuña as Pretendiente de Soledad.
 Orietta Grendi as Myriam.
 Cristián García-Huidobro as the Animator fashion competition.
 Ramón Núñez
 Archibaldo Larenas as Santiago Valdivia.

Soundtrack 
 Que me pasa Contigo - Aline Kuppenheim (Opening theme)
 Pequeño Rayo de Sol - Alberto Plaza
 Coche Viejo - Paralamas
 Mas Fuerte de lo que Pensaba - Aleks Syntek
 Cariño Mio - Soledad Guerrero
 Temporal de amor - Leandro y Leonardo
 Golpes y besos - Leandro y Leonardo
 Mejor no hablemos de amor - Enanitos Verdes
 Vida - La Mafia
 Locos por Amor - Francesc Picas
 Cómo voy a renunciar a tí - Cecilia Echenique
 Subire - Cinema
 Mucha Experiencia - Los Pericos
 Canción por un encuentro - Alberto Plaza
 Volver a nacer - Chayanne
 Runaway - Los Pericos
 Angel Descarriado - Cinema
 Parate y Mira - Los Pericos 
 El amor esta de moda - Aline Kuppenheim 
 La vida - La Sociedad
 Amor por bandera - Francesc Picas

Other versions 
  Ti Ti Ti - a Brazilian telenovela produced and aired by Rede Globo in 1995.
  Ti Ti Ti - remake of the 1985 Brazilian telenovela also produced and aired by Rede Globo in 2010.

References

External links 
 

1995 telenovelas
1995 Chilean television series debuts
1995 Chilean television series endings
Canal 13 (Chilean TV channel) telenovelas
Chilean telenovelas
Spanish-language telenovelas